2022 in Bellator MMA is the fourteenth year in the history of Bellator MMA, a mixed martial arts promotion based in the United States.

Events list

Bellator Light Heavyweight World Grand Prix Tournament

Bellator Bantamweight World Grand Prix Tournament
The eight participants of the tournament were revealed on December 3, 2021. They include current champion Sergio Pettis, the former Rizin and Bellator champion Kyoji Horiguchi, another former Bellator champion in Juan Archuleta, who captured the vacant bantamweight title in 2020 against Patchy Mix, who will also be in the tournament. The final four fighters in the Grand Prix are all ranked in the top six by Bellator at 135 pounds: Magomed Magomedov, James Gallagher, Raufeon Stots and Leandro Higo. Pettis and Gallagher would eventually pull out due to injuries requiring surgery. Due to the pull outs, two wild card qualifier bouts between Josh Hill and Enrique Barzola, with the winner meeting Magomed Magomedov in the opening round, and the second qualifier between Jornel Lugo and Danny Sabatello, which will have the winner face Leandro Higo in the first round of the tournament. Due to Covid, Hill had to pull out of the bout and was replaced by Nikita Mikhailov.

Title fights

See also 
 List of Bellator events
 List of current Bellator fighters
 Bellator MMA Rankings
 2022 in UFC
 2022 in ONE Championship
 2022 in Absolute Championship Akhmat
 2022 in Konfrontacja Sztuk Walki
 2022 in Rizin Fighting Federation
 2022 in AMC Fight Nights
 2022 in Brave Combat Federation
 2022 in Road FC
 2022 Professional Fighters League season
 2022 in Eagle Fighting Championship
 2022 in Legacy Fighting Alliance
 2022 in combat sports

References

External links
Bellator

2022 in mixed martial arts
Bellator MMA events